Becca Harvey, better known by her stage name Girlpuppy, is an American indie rock musician from Atlanta, Georgia.

History
Harvey began her career in 2020, during the COVID-19 pandemic. That same year, she signed to record label Royal Mountain Records and then released her debut EP Swan on August 20, 2021, which was produced by Marshall Vore. In July 2022, Harvey announced her debut album, When I'm Alone. Alongside the announcement, Harvey released a new song titled "Wish". The album was released on October 28, 2022.

Harvey's music has been compared to Phoebe Bridgers.

Discography
Studio albums
When I'm Alone (2022, Royal Mountain Records)
EPs
Swan (2021, Royal Mountain Records)
Audiotree Live (2021, Audiotree Music)
Singles

 "For You" (2020, non-album single, Player Two Recordings)
 "Cheerleader" (2020, album single, Royal Mountain Records)
"River" (2020, non-album single, Royal Mountain Records)
Chateau Lobby #4 (in D for Two Virgins) (2021, non-album single, Royal Mountain Records)
"As Much As I Can" (2021, album single, Royal Mountain Records)
"Miniature Furnature" (2021, album single, Royal Mountain Records)
"Happy Xmas (War Is Over)" (2021, non-album single, Royal Mountain Records)
"I Miss When I Smelled Like You" (2022, non-album single, Royal Mountain Records)
"Wish" (2022, album single, Royal Mountain Records)
"I Want To Be There" (2022, album single, Royal Mountain Records)
"Destroyer" (2022, album single, Royal Mountain Records)
"Teenage Dream" (2022, album single, Royal Mountain Records)

References

Living people
Year of birth missing (living people)
American indie rock musicians
Royal Mountain Records artists